Bradmore House is a Grade II listed building in Queen Caroline Street, Hammersmith, London.

References

External links

Grade II listed buildings in the London Borough of Hammersmith and Fulham
Hammersmith